Mario Krstovski (born 3 April 1998) is a Macedonian professional footballer who plays as a forward for Bosnian Premier League club Sloga Meridian.

Club career

Zrinjski Mostar
In July 2021, Krstovski signed for Bosnian Premier League club Zrinjski Mostar on a free transfer. He was then sent on loan to Leotar and once to Makedonija G.P..

Sloga Meridian
After a year in Zrinjski, Krstovski joined newly-promoted Bosnian Premier League club Sloga Meridian.

Career statistics

Club

Honours
Akademija Pandev
Macedonian Football Cup: 2018–19

References

1998 births
Living people
Macedonian sportspeople
Macedonian footballers
North Macedonia youth international footballers
North Macedonia under-21 international footballers
North Macedonia international footballers
Association football forwards
Akademija Pandev players
FK Rabotnički players
FK Makedonija Gjorče Petrov players
HŠK Zrinjski Mostar players
FK Leotar players
FK Sloga Doboj players
Premier League of Bosnia and Herzegovina players
Expatriate footballers in Bosnia and Herzegovina
Macedonian expatriate sportspeople in Bosnia and Herzegovina